Czech Lion Award for Best Sound is award given to the Czech film with best Sound.

Winners

External links

Czech Lion Awards
Awards established in 1994
1994 establishments in the Czech Republic